Daniel Helldén (born 1965) is a Swedish politician. He was elected as Member of the Riksdag in September 2022. He represents the constituency of Stockholm Municipality. He is affiliated with the Green Party.

Helldén earned a PhD in political science from Stockholm University in 2005, writing his dissertation on the Battle of the Elms. Helldén led the Greens in the Stockholm Municipality council between 2011 and 2022, where he had headed the work on transportation since 2014.

References

External links 
 

Living people
1965 births
Place of birth missing (living people)
21st-century Swedish politicians
Members of the Riksdag 2022–2026
Members of the Riksdag from the Green Party